The Lahaussois was a French automobile manufactured only in 1907.  The company, headquartered in Paris, offered both chassis and complete vehicles.

References

Defunct motor vehicle manufacturers of France